Amanoa bracteosa is a species of plant in the family Phyllanthaceae. It is found in Ivory Coast, Ghana, Liberia, and Sierra Leone. It is threatened by habitat loss.

References

bracteosa
Vulnerable plants
Taxonomy articles created by Polbot